"Rotting in Vain" is a song by American nu metal band Korn. Written by the band and produced by Nick Raskulinecz, it was featured on the band's 2016 twelfth studio album The Serenity of Suffering. The song was also released as the lead single from the album on July 22, 2016, reaching number 4 on the Billboard Mainstream Rock Songs chart and number 26 on the UK Rock & Metal Singles Chart. It was nominated for Best Metal Performance at the 59th Annual Grammy Awards.

Release
"Rotting in Vain" was first revealed on July 16, 2016 when it received its debut live performance at the Chicago Open Air concert. According to Loudwire's Graham Hartmann, "Rotting in Vain" is "Led by a heavy groove and chaotic atmosphere", which later "spirals into darker realms with Jonathan Davis' tortured vocals". Jon Wiederhorn for Radio.com added that the song features "otherworldly guitar effects, a deep, dark groove ... downtuned, distorted guitars and circular bass lines". Speaking about the inspiration for the track upon its release, Korn frontman Jonathan Davis offered the following insight:

Music video 
The music video for "Rotting in Vain" was released on July 22, 2016, following a trailer four days before. Directed by Dean Karr and filmed in "a rundown two-story building" in Los Angeles, California, it features actor Tommy Flanagan, best known for portraying Filip "Chibs" Telford on the FX TV series Sons of Anarchy and Tullk from Guardians of the Galaxy Vol. 2, who is shown "huff[ing] gas, drink[ing] from a goblet and play[ing] with curios" as the band performs elsewhere in the building and "all but destroys his Sweeney Todd–styled abode". During the opening section of the song, vocalist Jonathan Davis emerges from underneath layers of leaves and dust in a bathtub, which the singer claimed entered his lungs and led to him "coughing up dirt loogies" afterwards. Other members of the band make "similarly dramatic entrances", including guitarists James "Munky" Shaffer "burst[ing] from the floorboards" and Brian "Head" Welch "crash[ing] through cement". Jonathan Davis getting out of a pile of leaves in a bathtub. Raymond Luzier "Ray" getting through wooden crates and rubbish. "Fieldy" Reginald Arvizu waking up in paper and wood.

Critical reception
Metal Hammer's Dom Lawson praised the song, including its "big" chorus and "wickedly self-referential burst of Davies' [sic] trademark gorilla gibberish", claiming that "Korn sound newly excited and ferociously focused". The track has been dubbed by many commentators as a conscious return to the style of the band's earlier releases – Lawson compared it stylistically to 1999's Issues and 2002's Untouchables, in part due to the presence of scat singing, Radio.com's Jon Wiederhorn described it as "reminiscent" of Life Is Peachy (1996) and Follow the Leader (1998), while Graham Hartmann of Loudwire simply dubbed it "classic Korn".

Charts

Weekly charts

Year-end charts

References

External links
"Rotting in Vain" music video on YouTube

2016 songs
2016 singles
Korn songs
Songs written by Jonathan Davis
Songs written by James Shaffer
Songs written by Brian Welch
Songs written by Reginald Arvizu
Roadrunner Records singles